HD 208741, also known as HR 8380, is a yellowish-white hued star located in the southern circumpolar constellation Octans. It has an apparent magnitude of 5.91, making it faintly visible to the naked eye.

Together, they make up a wide binary system designated collectively as CPD−76°1542. Sir John Herschel, the discoverer of the pair, noted the primary to be a probable spectroscopic binary.

This object has a stellar classification of F3 III, indicating that it is a slightly evolved F-type star. Gaia Data Release 3 models it to be a dwarf that is 81.3% through its main sequence lifetime. At present it has 1.52 times the mass of the Sun and a slightly enlarged radius of  due to its evolved state. HD 208741 has a metallicity twice the Sun's, making it metal enriched.

References

F-type giants
K-type main-sequence stars
208741
PD-76 01542
108849
8380
Octantis, 66
Double stars
High-proper-motion stars
Octans